Joan Larkin (born April 16, 1939 in Boston) is an American poet and playwright. She was active in the small press lesbian feminist publishing explosion in the 1970s, co-founding the independent publishing company Out & Out Books. She is now in her fourth decade of teaching writing. The science fiction writer Donald Moffitt was her brother.

Biography
Joan Larkin earned a Bachelor of Arts degree at Swarthmore College, a Master of Arts degree in English at the University of Arizona, and a Master of Fine Arts degree in playwriting at Brooklyn College.

Larkin has served on the faculties of Brooklyn College, Sarah Lawrence College, and Goddard College, and as Distinguished Visiting Poet at Columbia College Chicago. She is a member of the core faculty of the Master of Fine Arts Program in Poetry Writing at Drew University.

Larkin has also participated in institutions and theater companies as a visiting instructor (poet-in-residence) at West Side YMCA Writers Community in New York for a couple of years (1994-1996). Additional to that, Larkin Co-founded Out & Out Books (1975), a Lesbian Poetry Archive, with her bibliography, "Housework" is located in Brooklyn, NY: Out & Out Books.

Works and themes
Joan Larkin's most recent poetry collection is My Body: New and Selected Poems (Hanging Loose Press, 2007). Previous books of poetry include Housework, A Long Sound, Sor Juana's Love Poems (translated with Jaime Manrique), and Cold River.
 
Her writing includes The Hole in the Sheet, a Klezmer musical farce, and two books of daily meditations in the Hazelden recovery series: If You Want What We Have and Glad Day. The Living, her verse play about AIDS, has been produced at festivals in Boston and New York.

Literary prizes
Larkin is the 2011 recipient of the Academy of American Poets Fellowship. She has also received the Poetry Society of America's 2011 Shelley Memorial Award. Poet Rigoberto González is co-recipient of the award. She has also received the Publishing Triangle's 2008 Audre Lorde Award for Lesbian Poetry, for her book My Body: New and Selected Poems. In addition, Joan Larkin has received the Lambda Literary Award for poetry twice, in 1988 (for Gay and Lesbian Poetry in Our Time, with Carl Morse) and in 1997 (for Cold River). In the 1970s, she co-founded the independent small press Out & Out Books and co-edited the anthologies Amazon Poetry and Lesbian Poetry (with Elly Bulkin). Her anthology of coming out stories, A Woman Like That, was nominated for a Publishing Triangle award and a Lambda Literary Award for nonfiction in 2000. She served as poetry editor for the first three years of the queer literary journal Bloom. She is co-editor, with David Bergman, of the Living Out autobiography series at the University of Wisconsin Press. In addition to Larkin's Lambda Literary Awards (1989), her awards include fellowships in poetry and playwriting from the Massachusetts Cultural Council (1995), New York Foundation for the Arts, and the National Endowment for the Arts (19787-1988), as well as a Creative Artists public service grant from the New York State Council of the Arts in 1976 and in 1980.

Bibliography

Poetry
 Housework (Out & Out Books, 1975) 
 A Long Sound (Granite Press, 1986) 
 Cold River (Painted Leaf Press, 1997) 
 Sor Juana's Love Poems/ Poemas de Amor (in Spanish and English, Sor Juana Inez de la Cruz, Joan Larkin, Jaime Manrique; Painted Leaf Press, 1997, reprinted, University of Wisconsin Press, 2003) 
 My Body: New and Selected Poems (Hanging Loose Press, 2007)

Prose
 If You Want What We Have: Sponsorship Meditations (Hazelden, 1998) 
 Glad Day: Daily Meditations for Gay, Lesbian, Bisexual, and Transgender People (Hazelden, 1998)

Collections edited
 Amazon Poetry: An Anthology (with Elly Bulkin, Out & Out Books, 1975) 
 Lesbian Poetry: An Anthology (with Elly Bulkin, Persephone Press, 1981) 
 Gay and Lesbian Poetry in Our Time: An Anthology (with Carl Morse, St. Martin's Press, 1988) 
 A Woman Like That: Lesbian and Bisexual Writers Tell their Coming Out Stories (Avon/Bard Books, 1999) 
 Living Out: Gay and Lesbian Autobiographies (with David Bergman and Raphael Kadushin, Painted Leaf Press)
 Women Writers Calendar (1982-1984)
 Blood & Tears: Poems for Matthew Shepard (with Scott Gibson, Painted Leaf Press, 1999) 

Recordings
 A Sign I Was Not Alone (LP recording of poets Adrienne Rich, Honor Moore, Audre Lorde, Joan Larkin, New York: Out & Out Books, 1980)

Limited editions
 ‘’A Garden,’’ letterpress broadside (Center for Book Arts, NYC, 2005)
 ‘’Waste Not,’’ letterpress broadside (Bridge Press, Vermont, 2005)
 ‘’Boston Piano,’’ Belladonna limited edition poetry chapbook, June 2003
 ‘’Hard Differences,’’ letterpress broadside, American Populist Poetry Series, 1980

Plays: staged readings, productions
 The AIDS Passion, staged reading, Mount Holyoke College, April 1995
 The Living, staged reading, Huntington Theater Company, Boston, December 1996; full production, Brooklyn Arts Exchange, June 2000
 The Hole in the Sheet, book and lyrics for a klezmer musical farce, music by Steve Elson (currently seeking production)
 Wiretap, Jean Cocteau Repertory Theater, NYC, December 2001, staged reading by Brooklyn College Theater Department
 Brother Dust, a hip-hop version of Sophocles' Antigone'' (currently seeking production)

External links
 Joan Larkin's website
 Joan Larkin's blog
 "Photo", poem by Larkin, thethepoetry.com 
 Publishing Triangle Award winners, 2008
 LAMBDA Literary Award winners, 1988
 LAMBDA Literary Award winners, 1997
 The Academy of American Poets: My Body
 The Academy of American Poets: Gay and Lesbian Poetry in Our Time
 Columbia College Chicago
 Tarpaulin Sky
Article in POZ magazine, November 2006
 Isle of Lesbos website, biographies of popular contemporary lesbian poets 
Hanging Loose Press
 HarperCollins Publishers
 University of Wisconsin Press 

1939 births
American educators
Swarthmore College alumni
Lesbian feminists
American lesbian writers
American women poets
20th-century American dramatists and playwrights
American women dramatists and playwrights
Lambda Literary Award for Lesbian Poetry winners
Living people
American LGBT dramatists and playwrights
LGBT people from Massachusetts
American LGBT poets
20th-century American women writers
Brooklyn College alumni
Brooklyn College faculty
21st-century American women writers